Piet Noordijk (May 25, 1932 – October 8, 2011) was a Dutch saxophonist.

Noordijk played with orchestras and big bands, including The Skymasters, The Ramblers and Malando. He was awarded the Wessel Ilcken Prize in 1965. Between 1978 and 1992, Noordijk played alto saxophone with the Metropole Orchestra. In 1987 he won a Bird Award.

1932 births
2011 deaths
Dutch jazz musicians
Dutch saxophonists
Male saxophonists
Male jazz musicians
The Ramblers (band) members
Codarts University for the Arts alumni
20th-century saxophonists